Havlíček (feminine Havlíčková) is a Czech surname. It means small Havel. Havel is a masculine given name that means inhabitant of Gallia. Notable people with the surname include:

 Aneta Havlíčková, Czech volleyball player
 Barbora Havlíčková, Czech skier
 Bedřich Havlíček, Czech historian
 Eduard Havlicek, Austrian football player and coach
 Hilde Hawlicek (born 1942), Austrian politician
 Jan Havlíček, Czech canoeist
 Jaroslav Havlíček (1896–1943), Czech author of psychological novels
 John Havlicek (1940–2019), American former professional basketball player
 Karel Havlíček Borovský (1821–1856), Czech author and journalist
 Karel Havlíček (1907–1988), Czech artist
 Kateřina Havlíčková, Czech slalom canoeist
 Lucie Havlíčková, Czech tennis player
 Veronika Havlíčková (born 1987), Czech pair skater
 Vincenz Havlicek (1864–1915), Austrian painter

Czech-language surnames
Surnames from given names